Kéran is a prefecture located in the Kara Region of Togo. The capital city is Kandé. The cantons (or subdivisions) of Kéran include Kantè, Atalotè, Pessidè, Tamberma-Est (Koutougou), Tamberma-Ouest (Nadoba), Hélota, Warengo, Akponté, Ossacré.

References 

Prefectures of Togo
Kara Region